Marino Vagnetti (born 11 February 1924) was a Sammarinese politician. He served twice Captain Regent of San Marino from 1 October 1971 to 1 April 1972, and from 1 April 1989 to 1 October 1989.

References

1924 births
Possibly living people
Captains Regent of San Marino